The North Queen Anne Drive Bridge is a deck arch bridge that spans Seattle's Wolf Creek. It serves as a connection between the Queen Anne neighborhood and the George Washington Memorial Bridge that carries State Route 99. The arch is unusually high and uses a minimal number of supporting members. It was designated a city landmark on December 28, 1981, because of its unique engineering style.

An expansion joint suffered cracking and spalling during the 2001 Nisqually earthquake.  The bridge has been retrofitted to make it more earthquake-resistant.

References

Bridges in Seattle
Bridges completed in 1936
Landmarks in Seattle
Road bridges in Washington (state)
Queen Anne, Seattle
1936 establishments in Washington (state)
Steel bridges in the United States